Georkis Vera (born 22 May 1975) is a Cuban sprinter. He competed in the men's 4 × 400 metres relay at the 1996 Summer Olympics.

References

1975 births
Living people
Athletes (track and field) at the 1996 Summer Olympics
Cuban male sprinters
Olympic athletes of Cuba
Place of birth missing (living people)